The Here and Now Tour (originally known as the Chillaxification Tour) was the sixteenth headlining concert tour by American country music recording artist, Kenny Chesney. The tour is in support of his nineteenth studio album, Here and Now (2020). Pre-dominantly visiting the United States, there are 41 shows planned during the spring and summer of 2022.

Background

The tour was announced in September 2019, with 20 shows planned for stadiums in the spring and summer of 2020. Country acts Florida Georgia Line and Old Dominion were slated as support acts for the tour. Later in December 2019, the tour expanded, adding an additional 18 shows to be performed in amphitheaters. For these shows, Michael Franti & Spearhead were announced as the opening act. 

The COVID-19 pandemic took a heavy toll on the live entertainment industry. In March 2020, Chesney postponed the tour to begin at the end of May 2020. A few months later, The Messina Touring Group announced all dates were postponed. Chesney wrote to his fan base (the No Shoes Nation) postponing all dates was a late resort. The singer also mentioned meeting with his team, MTG, medical experts, city commissioners, venue management, and the NFL daily to make the tour happen in 2020. 

Later that summer, postponed shows were rescheduled. The tour was set to start in April 2021, with the new country group Gone West added as a support act. However, as the effects of the pandemic increased, the tour was postponed once again.

A year later, Chesney revealed the tour will finally take place in 2022. The singer also renamed the tour. Its full title with sponsorship is "Blue Chair Bay Rum Presents Here And Now 2022 Fueled by Marathon". As of July 2021, there are no support acts that have been announced for the new dates. 

Speaking of the tour, Chesney stated:"Like it does for everyone, the idea of music, live music, fills me up [...] Nothing is so in the moment, so completely alive. I want to start 2022 with the awesome rush that embodies everything playing for No Shoes Nation is. We're calling the tour Here And Now 2022, because when we get together, there is only the present – and it's so electric and good, I know I don't want it to end. I just want to be 100% there with all of you."

On February 7, 2022, Chesney announced 20 amphitheater to coincide with the 21 stadium dates.

Following the tour, Pollstar reported Chesney had broken 14 personal ticket sales records, and in many markets had to push the stage further into the end zone to accommodate the demand for tickets.

Tour dates

Cancellations and rescheduled shows

Band
Kenny Chesney – Lead vocals, guitar
Wyatt Beard – Keyboards
Nick Buda - Drums
Jon Conley - Guitar
Kenny Greenberg - Guitar
Harmoni Kelley – Bass
Danny Rader - Guitar

References

External links 
Official Website of Kenny Chesney

2022 concert tours
Kenny Chesney concert tours
Concert tours postponed due to the COVID-19 pandemic